Number Nineteen is an album by American jazz pianist Mal Waldron featuring a performance recorded in Baarn, Holland in 1971 and released on the Freedom label.

Track listing
All compositions by Mal Waldron except as indicated
 "Number Nineteen" — 22:15  
 "Trip" — 10:09  
 "Watakushi No Sekai" — 10:40 
Recorded  in Baarn, Holland on May 30, 1971.

Personnel
 Mal Waldron — piano
 Dick Van Der Capellen — bass
 Martin Van Duynhoven — drums

References

Freedom Records live albums
Mal Waldron albums
1971 live albums